The 2013 I Lyga (also known as LFF I Lyga) is the 24th season of the I Lyga, the second-tier association football league of Lithuania. The season started on 8 April 2013 and end is planned for 24 September 2013.

Changes from 2013 

The league changed its number of teams, increasing it from 10 teams in 2012 I Lyga to 12 teams in 2013. Two teams of 2012 resigned – FK Granitas Vilnius and NFA Kaunas (replaced by FM Spyris Kaunas), and another two were relegated – FK Venta Kuršėnai and FK Kėdainiai. From LFF II lyga were admitted 5 teams – 3 from zone South (FK Žalgiris-3 Vilnius, FK Šilas Kazlų Rūda and FM Spyris Kaunas) and 2 from zone West (FK Lokomotyvas Radviliškis and FK Klaipėdos Granitas). A newly created team of FK Baltija Panevėžys was also allowed to start at I lyga in 2013.

Stadia and locations

Regular season

Promotion play-offs 
Semi-finals:
Syris 2-3(a.e.t.) Kaunas

Nevėžis 0-1 Trakai

Final:
Kaunas 0-0 (a.e.t.), 1-3p Trakai

Top goalscorers 

 As of 20 August 2013.

References 

2013
2
Lith
Lith